Vasundhara is a township within the jurisdiction of U.P. Housing & Development Board Ghaziabad Circle (Vasundhara Zone) in Ghaziabad District of Uttar Pradesh, India. It falls in Delhi's National Capital Region.

Education
Schools 
 Delhi Public School, Ghaziabad
 Seth Anandram Jaipuria School, Vasundhara
 Vanasthali Public School, Vasundhara

Colleges
 Jaipuria Institute of Management
 Jaipuria School of Business

See also
 Hindon River
 Noida
 New Delhi

References

Cities and towns in Ghaziabad district, India